Crosby, Stills & Nash have toured for five decades. Since 1982 they toured yearly with a few exceptions. Notably in  1986 when David Crosby was serving a prison sentence. Touring has tended to focus on North America, but the band have also played in Europe and other parts of the world.

1984 Tour dates 

Lineup:

 David Crosby - guitar, vocals
 Stephen Stills - guitar, keyboards, vocals
 Graham Nash - guitar, keyboards, vocals
 Mike Finnigan - keyboards
 Kim Bullard - keyboards
 Kenny Passarelli (replaced by George "Chocolate" Perry) - bass 
 Ian Wallace - drums
 Joe Lala - percussion

Setlist:

1985 Tour dates 

Lineup:
David Crosby - guitar, vocals
Stephen Stills - guitar, keyboards, vocals
Graham Nash - guitar, keyboards, vocals
Mike Finnigan - keyboards
 Kim Bullard (replaced by Craig Doerge) - keyboards 
George "Chocolate" Perry - bass
 Mark T. Williams - drums
Joe Lala - percussion

1987 Tour dates 

Lineup:
David Crosby - guitar, vocals
Stephen Stills - guitar, keyboards, vocals
Graham Nash - guitar, keyboards, vocals
Mike Finnigan - keyboards
 Bob Glaub - bass
 Joe Vitale - drums
Joe Lala - percussion

1988 Tour dates 

Lineup:
David Crosby - guitar, vocals
Stephen Stills - guitar, keyboards, vocals
Graham Nash - guitar, keyboards, vocals
Mike Finnigan - keyboards
 Bob Glaub - bass
 Joe Vitale - drums
Joe Lala - percussion

1989 Tour dates 

Lineup:
David Crosby - guitar, vocals
Stephen Stills - guitar, keyboards, vocals
Graham Nash - guitar, keyboards, vocals
Mike Finnigan - keyboards
 Bob Glaub - bass
 Joe Vitale - drums
Joe Lala - percussion

1990 Live It Up Tour dates 

Lineup:
David Crosby - guitar, vocals
Stephen Stills - guitar, keyboards, vocals
Graham Nash - guitar, keyboards, vocals
Mike Finnigan - keyboards
Kim Bullard - keyboards
Jorge Calderon - bass
Joe Vitale - drums
Michito Sanchez - percussion

1994 25th Anniversary After the Storm Tour 

Lineup:
David Crosby - guitar, vocals
Stephen Stills - guitar, keyboards, vocals
Graham Nash - guitar, keyboards, vocals
Mike Finnigan - keyboards
Alexis Sklarevski - bass
Jody Cortez - drums 
Ethan Johns - various

1996 Tour 
Lineup:
David Crosby - guitar, vocals
Stephen Stills - guitar, keyboards, vocals
Graham Nash - guitar, keyboards, vocals
Mike Finnigan - keyboards
Gerald Johnson - bass
Joe Vitale - drums

1997 Tour 
Lineup:
David Crosby - guitar, vocals
Stephen Stills - guitar, keyboards, vocals
Graham Nash - guitar, keyboards, vocals
Mike Finnigan - keyboards
James Hutchinson - bass
Joe Vitale - drums

1999 Tour 
Lineup:
David Crosby - guitar, vocals
Stephen Stills - guitar, keyboards, vocals
Graham Nash - guitar, keyboards, vocals
Mike Finnigan - keyboards
James Hutchinson - bass
Joe Vitale - drums

References